The Hakka are a Han Chinese people group.

Hakka may also refer to:
 Hakka Chinese, a branch of the Chinese language
 Hakka architecture
 Hakka cuisine
 Harihara I, also known as Hakka, king and ruler of the ancient Vijayanagara Empire
 Hakka (spider), a genus of jumping spiders